Symphlebia jalapa is a moth in the subfamily Arctiinae. It was described by Herbert Druce in 1894. It is found in Mexico.

References
Notes

Sources

Moths described in 1894
jalapa